Eugnosta romanovi is a species of moth of the  family Tortricidae. It is found in China (Xinjiang) and Russia.

References

Moths described in 1900
Eugnosta